Gunther Erich Rothenberg (11 July 1923 – 26 April 2004) was an internationally known military historian, best known for his publications on the Habsburg military and Napoleonic Wars. He had a fifteen-year military career, as a British Army soldier in World War II, a Haganah officer in the 1948 Arab–Israeli War, and in the United States Air Force during the Korean War.

Escape from Nazi Germany and military service
Gunther Erich Rothenberg was born in Berlin, Germany, during the time of the Weimar Republic, as the son of Erich Abraham Rothenberg and Lotte Cohn. His family was a culturally assimilated German Jewish family. In 1937, Rothenberg moved to the Netherlands with his mother; his father later joined them. The family moved next to Britain, where Rothenberg had some schooling. In 1939, he moved to Mandatory Palestine, then under British rule. There he joined the Zionist movement and Hashomer Hatzair (The Youth Guard), a Socialist-Zionist youth movement. He retained his passion for a Jewish homeland throughout his life.

On 13 July 1941, his parents emigrated to the United States on the Villa de Madrid, an overcrowded ocean-liner that left Barcelona on 20 June. His father, Erich Joseph Rothenberg, was an importer, and both his parents spoke English, Hebrew, French, and German. Their visas, issued in Lisbon, Portugal, claimed Cuban citizenship. At the age of 57, his father registered for the fourth draft in 1942, listing his residence as New York City, and his next of kin as his wife, Lotte.

In 1941, Gunther Rothenberg volunteered for the British army, serving in an all-Jewish unit. He was wounded in North Africa. He transferred from the Royal Army Service Corps to the Intelligence Corps and fought with the Eighth Army. He served in the Italian campaign, in the Yugoslav war of liberation and in Austria. His service continued in the occupation of Austria until 1946.  He was a civilian employee of U.S. Intelligence 1946–1948.  Rothenberg returned to Palestine and joined the Haganah for 1948 Palestine war. He rose to the rank of captain in the Israel Defense Forces.

By 1948, Rothenberg's father had died and his mother, Lotte (1894–1990), had become a naturalized United States citizen. To be with her in New York City, Rothenberg journeyed to Canada, arriving in Halifax, Nova Scotia; traveling from there to Toronto, he lived for a while at Wycliffe College, where he worked briefly as a construction laborer. On 19 November 1948, he crossed the international border into the United States at Buffalo, with $12.00 in his pocket. In 1951, he volunteered for the United States Army, transferred to the Air Force, and served in the Korean War. He left the Air Force in 1955. He remained guided by a deep sense of duty and a strong sense of American patriotism throughout his life.

Education and career

After military service in the United States Air Force, he graduated from the University of Illinois with an undergraduate degree. Two years later, he had a master's degree from the University of Chicago. In 1959 he finished his doctoral degree at the University of Illinois at Urbana-Champaign. He retired from Purdue University, was appointed Professor Emeritus, and lived in Canberra, Australia, where he continued to write about the Napoleonic Wars.

He wrote several ground-breaking books on the organization of the Habsburg military and the military reforms of Archduke Charles in the first decade of the Napoleonic Wars. His last book, The Emperor's Last Victory, about the Battle of Wagram in 1809, was published posthumously.
Although he had never finished high school, with the help of the GI Bill, Rothenberg completed a bachelor's degree from the University of Illinois in 1954. He attended graduate school at the University of Chicago, where he was recognized as an argumentative, sometimes abrasive, graduate student with a keen mind. As a graduate student, Rothenberg reviewed W.E.D. Allens Caucasian Battlefields: A History of the Wars on the Turco-Caucasian Border, 1828–1921 (Cambridge University Press, 1953) for Journal of Modern History, He wrote his 1956 masters' thesis entitled General Crook and the Apaches, 1871–1874: the campaign in the Tonto Basin. Rothenberg received his doctorate from the University of Illinois: his 1959 dissertation, Antemurales Christianitatis: then military border in Croatia, 1522–1749, was published in 1960 by the University of Chicago Press, as The Military Border in Croatia, 1522–1749; he followed this with a second study, The Military Border in Croatia, 1750–1888: a study of an imperial institution in 1966, also published by University of Chicago Press. Both volumes were translated into German in 1970.

In part-time temporary teaching positions in Illinois and four years at the Southern Illinois University, Rothenberg taught European and world history, and published an instructor's manual on history of the world, with Henry C. Boren. In 1962, Rothenberg joined the faculty of the  University of New Mexico; over the following ten years, he rose to the position of full professor. In 1962–63, he was the recipient of a Guggenheim Fellowship. In 1972, he accepted a position at Purdue University. There, he taught courses in military and European history. As a teacher, his popular course on World War II attracted more than 250 undergraduates annually.

In the 1970s, Rothenberg also established himself as an international Napoleonic scholar with The Art of Warfare in the Age of Napoleon, published in 1977. He also mentored hundreds of graduate and doctoral students. He regularly published in such peer-reviewed publications as Journal of Military History and served on the editorial board of War in History. In 1985, Rothenberg was a visiting  Fulbright fellow in the Department of History in the Faculty of Military Studies at the Australian Royal Military College, Duntroon. He retired from Purdue in 1999 and was named Professor Emeritus.

From 1995 to 2001, Rothenberg was a visiting fellow at the School of Historical Studies, Monash University. After his retirement, he moved to Melbourne, Australia, and then to Canberra, where his third wife, Eleanor Hancock, taught at the Australian Defence Force Academy. Although retired, he continued to teach, lecture, and publish reviews. He also wrote two more books.

Life in Australia did not always please him; he missed both his colleagues in North America and his Purdue students. His politics—he "was anything but politically correct"—did not mesh well with Australia's leftist atmosphere. He wrote indignantly to a friend in the United States that he regretted moving to Australia when the authorities confiscated his muzzle loaders, which were prohibited "Down Under."

In 2004, he returned to the United States to present the keynote address at the 34th Annual Conference of the Consortium on Revolutionary Europe. He had recently completed The Emperor’s Last Victory: Napoleon and the Battle of Wagram, which was published posthumously in November 2004. He died at the age of 80.

Legacy
Rothenberg's legacy is not only the generations of scholars he prepared, but also his vast historiographical contribution to understanding the Revolutionary era. For many years, his Army of Francis Joseph (1976) was the standard and the only English language analysis of the Habsburg Army in the French Revolutionary and the Napoleonic wars. He changed the widespread perception of Archduke Charles' military acumen. A masterful historian, Rothenberg was known furthermore as an eminently fair scholar. After publishing a critique of a publication, the author contacted him, and proved the critique unjust; Rothenberg immediately wrote to a review retracting the criticism, and the two scholars remained friends for the remainder of his life.

Some of his colleagues considered Rothenberg "the greatest scholar of the Napoleonic era of our day." His adventurous life and diverse experiences gave him a deep understanding of human nature. This made him a valuable colleague and a treasured mentor for his many graduate students.  

High Point University conducts the Gunther E. Rothenberg Seminar in Military History.

Personal life and family
His first marriage in 1952 ended in a 1967 divorce. In 1969, Rothenberg married Ruth Gillah Smith, a widow with three daughters (Judith Goris, Laura Allman, Georgia Jones (all born Herron)), whom he helped to raise; she died in 1992. In 1995, he married for a third time, to Eleanor Hancock, a lecturer at Monash University in Australia.  She is now a senior lecturer in history at the Australian Defence Force Academy at the University of New South Wales, and has written the first biography of Ernst Julius Röhm. Her 1988 doctoral thesis, National Socialist Leadership And Total War, 1941–45 for the Australia National University was published by St. Martin's Press in 1992.

Publications
Rothenberg published hundreds of journal articles, reviews, and lectures. This is a partial list.

Books

 (Subsequent editions titled Napoleon's Great Adversary: the Archduke Charles and the Austrian Army.)

 Distributed by Columbia University Press
 Distributed by Columbia University Press

Journal articles

References

Sources
Barker, Thomas M.  "Letters to the Editor." Project MUSE. 2004. Accessed 31 May 2010.
Browning, Reed. "Review: Rothenberg's The Emperor's Last Victory." European History Quarterly. 37:4, p. 638.
Council on Foreign Relations. "Capsule Reviews." Accessed 31 May 2010.
Daum, Andreas W. "Refugees from Nazi Germany as Historians: Origins and Migrations, Interests and Identities," in Andreas W. Daum, Hartmut Lehmann, James J. Sheehan (eds.), The Second Generation: Émigrés from Nazi Germany as Historians. With a Biobibliographic Guide. New York: Berghahn Books, 2016, 1‒52.
 Dennis, Peter and Eleanor Hancock. "Gunther Rothenberg Obituary." Jewish News (Melbourne). Melbourne, Australia, 11 June 2004.
Herwig, H. H. "Rebirth of the Habsburg Army." Central European History. (1997), 30: 116–117.
Schneid, Frederick. Gunther Rothenberg. H-net. 28 April 2004.
MacMillan Palgrave. "Eleanor Hancock". Macmillan. 2008–. Accessed 31 May 2010.
Reitan, Earl A. "Letter to the Editor." Journal of Military History. 68.4 (2004) 1343–1350.
Rothenberg, Gunther E(rich). Worldcat.org Worldcat. Accessed 31 May 2010.
Rothenberg, Gunther. "Review: War for the Everyday, by Eric Lund." The Journal of Military History. Vol. 64, No. 2 (Apr., 2000), pp. 522–523.
United States Government. Passenger Lists of Vessels Arriving at New York, New York, 1820–1897. (National Archives Microfilm Publication M237, 675 rolls); Records of the U.S. Customs Service, Record Group 36; National Archives, Washington, D.C. Readily available in a variety of indexes and databases. See for example Ancestry.
United States Government. Manifests of Alien Arrivals at Buffalo, Niagara Falls, and Rochester, New York, 1902–1954. (National Archives Micropublication M1480, 165 rolls); Records of the Immigration and Naturalization Service, RG 85; National Archives, Washington, D.C. Readily available in a variety of indexes and databases. See for example Ancestry.
United States, Selective Service System. Selective Service Registration Cards, World War II: Fourth Registration. National Archives and Records Administration Branch locations: National Archives and Records Administration Region Branches. Readily available in a variety of indexes and databases. See for example Ancestry.
United States, Soundex Index to Petitions for Naturalization filed in Federal, State, and Local Courts located in New York City, 1792–1989. New York, NY, USA: National Archives and Records Administration, Northeast Region. Readily available in a variety of indexes and databases. See for example Ancestry.
Mahler, Art.  "Glory and Liberty: Recollections of WWII." Accessed 24 June 2012.

External links

1923 births
2004 deaths
German emigrants to the United States
German military historians
Historians of the Napoleonic Wars
Writers from Berlin
University of Chicago alumni
University of Illinois alumni
Purdue University faculty
Illinois State University faculty
Southern Illinois University faculty
University of New Mexico faculty
Academic staff of Monash University
Academic staff of the University of New South Wales
United States Army soldiers
United States Air Force airmen
United States Air Force personnel of the Korean War
British Army personnel of World War II
Royal Army Service Corps soldiers
Intelligence Corps soldiers
Israeli soldiers
Palmach members
Jewish emigrants from Nazi Germany to the United States
Jewish American historians
American male non-fiction writers
German male non-fiction writers
Recipients of the Distinguished Conduct Medal